Stigmella austroamericana is a moth of the family Nepticulidae. It is found in the premontane rainforest on the Amazon in Ecuador.

The wingspan is 3.6-3.8 mm for males. Adults have been collected in late January.

External links
New Neotropical Nepticulidae (Lepidoptera) from the western Amazonian rainforest and the Andes of Ecuador

Nepticulidae
Moths of South America
Moths described in 2002